List of Field Hockey Clubs.

A 

 Annadale Hockey Club
 Avoca Hockey Club
 Club Atlético Porteño
 Atlètic Hockey Club
 Atlantic Storm Chasers

B 

 Bishop's Stortford Hockey Club 
 Bolton Hockey Club 
 Beeston Hockey Club
 Bowdon Hockey Club

C 

 Cannock Hockey Club
 Cliftonville Hockey Club
 Canterbury Hockey Club
 Chelmsford Hockey Club

D 

 Duchy Hockey Club

E 

 East Grinstead Hockey Club

F 

 Forestville Hockey Club

G 

 Grange Royals Hockey Club

H 

 Havant Hockey Club
 Heywood Hockey Club

I 

 Inverleith Hockey Club

J

K 

 Kampong (field hockey club)
 HC Klein Zwitserland

L 

 Leeds Adel Carnegie Hockey Club
 Leeds Hockey Club
 Leek Hockey Club
 Lincoln Hockey Club
 Lindum Hockey Club
 Lisnagarvey Hockey Club

M 

 Mossley Hockey Club

N 

 North Wilts hockey club

O 

 Oxted Hockey Club

P 

 Plymouth University Hockey Club
 Pembroke Wanderers Hockey Club

Q 

 Queen's University Hockey Club

R 

 Rochdale Hockey Club
 Reading Hockey Club
 Romford Hockey Club
 HC Rotterdam

S 

 Southgate Hockey Club
 Surbiton Hockey Club
 Sliema Hotsticks Hockey Club

T 

 Tameside Hockey Club

U 

 Uhlenhorster Hockey Club

V 

 Valley Hockey Club
 Vanguard Hockey Club Ansavo

W 

 Waltham Forest Hockey Club
 Wapping Hockey Club
 Waverley Hockey Club
 West Vancouver Field Hockey Club
 Woking Hockey Club

X

Y 

 Young Stars Hockey Club

Z

See also

References

 
clubs
Field hockey